A J-card is the paper card inserted in the plastic storage case of most audio cassette releases, as well as being latterly wrapped around the outside of many Blu-ray and DVD steelbooks and similar special editions. The J-card usually contains an image of the album cover, a track listing, credits, and copyright information, with some releases having foldout cards with multiple panels to contain lyrics, liner notes, or additional artwork. Most J-cards contain the title of the content on the edge for quick reference while in storage.

The J-card gets its name from being folded into the shape of the letter J (when viewed from the side) to fit inside the cassette's case.

Today, custom made CD-R covers are often called J-cards. Similarly styled covers were used in CD covers in the 1990s for single cases and are still used today.

See also
 Obi (publishing)
 Optical disc packaging

External links
The Legendary Web J-Card Polygizmo

Audio storage